In gemology, aventurescence (sometimes called aventurization) is an optical reflectance effect seen in certain gems. The effect amounts to a metallic glitter, arising from minute, preferentially oriented mineral platelets within the material. These platelets are so numerous that they also influence the material's body colour. In aventurine quartz chrome-bearing fuchsite produces a green stone, and various iron oxides produce a red stone.

The words aventurine and aventurescence derive from the Italian "a ventura", meaning "by chance". This is an allusion to the chance discovery of aventurine glass or goldstone at some point in the 18th century. Goldstone is still manufactured today as an artificial imitation of later discoveries aventurine quartz and aventurine feldspar (sunstone).

See also

References
 Webster, R. (2000). Gems: Their sources, descriptions and identification (5th ed.), p 231. Great Britain: Butterworth-Heinemann.

Mineralogy
Optical phenomena